The following is a list of notable deaths in August 1994.

Entries for each day are listed alphabetically by surname. A typical entry lists information in the following sequence:
 Name, age, country of citizenship at birth, subsequent country of citizenship (if applicable), reason for notability, cause of death (if known), and reference.

August 1994

1
Mario Baroni, 67, Italian racing cyclist.
Harold Boardman, 87, British politician.
George Malcolm Laws, 75, American folk music scholar.
Romilly Lunge, 89, British film actor.
Valery Yardy, 46, Soviet/Russian road cyclist and Olympian.

2
Eduardo Folle, 72, Uruguayan basketball player and Olympian.
Bert Freed, 74, American actor, heart attack.
Kelpo Gröndahl, 74, Finnish light-heavyweight Greco-Roman wrestler.
W. Pat Jennings, 74, American politician.

3
Hoyt Franklin Clines, 37, American convicted murderer, execution by lethal injection.
Wally Downer, 90, Canadian politician.
James William Holmes, 37, American convicted murderer, execution by lethal injection.
Hidalgo Moya, 74, American architect.
Darryl Richley, 43, American convicted murderer, execution by lethal injection.
Innokenty Smoktunovsky, 69, Soviet/Russian theater and film actor.
John Zenda, 50, American actor.

4
Solomon Adler, 84, English-American economist and Soviet spy.
Cyro dos Anjos, 87, Brazilian journalist, and writer.
Thomas Fulton, 44, American conductor, kidney failure.
Jürgen Jürgens, 68, German choral conductor and teacher.
Art Lassiter, 66, American singer, cancer.
Steve Myhra, 60, American gridiron football player, heart attack.
Giovanni Spadolini, 69, Italian politician and statesman, cancer.

5
Louis H. Bean, 98, American economic and political analyst.
Clive Caldwell, 84, Australian flying ace during World War II.
Cornelia C. Cameron, 83, American geologist.
Alain de Changy, 72, Belgian racing driver.
Terry Hibbitt, 46, English football player, cancer.
Solomon Kullback, 87, American cryptanalyst and mathematician.
Frederick Wheeler, 80, Australian public servant.
Muhammad Yaqub Ali, 82, Pakistani judge.

6
Henri Arends, 73, Dutch conductor.
Steven F. Arnold, 51, American visual artist and protégé of Salvador Dalí, AIDS.
Domenico Modugno, 66, Italian singer, songwriter, actor, and politician, heart attack.
Jacques Pelzer, 70, Belgian musician.
Evan Vogds, 71, American gridiron football player.

7
Ignazio Balsamo, 81, Italian actor.
Rubi Dalma, 88, Italian actress.
Liu Haisu, 98, Chinese painter and art educator.
Leon Goldsworthy, 85, Australian bomb and mine specialist during World War II.
Robert Hutton, 74, American actor, pneumonia.
Larry Martyn, 60, British actor (Are You Being Served?, The Dick Emery Show, Whoops Baghdad).

8
Iberê Camargo, 79, Brazilian painter.
Robin Cavendish, 64, British advocate for disabled people and medical aid developer.
Serge Leclaire, 70, French psychiatrist and psychoanalyst.
Leonid Leonov, 95, Soviet/Russian novelist and playwright.
Morde_kay Seter, 78, Russian-Israeli composer.
Ada Smith, 91, British gymnast.

9
Howard W. Carson, 84, American politician.
Aldo Donelli, 87, American football player and coach, and soccer player.
William Galbraith, 87, United States Navy admiral, gymnast and Olympic medalist.
Klaus Holighaus, 54, German glider designer and pilot, gliding accident.
Olle Johansson, 66, Swedish swimmer, water polo player and Olympian.
Helena Rasiowa, 77, Polish mathematician.

10
Biswamoy Biswas, 71, Indian ornithologist.
Marie Dollinger, 83, German track and field athlete.
Eliyahu Lankin, 79, Israeli zionist activist, Irgun member and politician.
Vladimir Melanin, 60, Soviet/Russian biathlete and Olympian.
Kay Petre, 91, Canadian motor racer.
Jessie Sumner, 96, American politician.

11
Stanislav Chekan, 72, Soviet/Russian actor of theater and cinema.
Gordon Cullen, 80, British architect and urban designer.
Peter Cushing, 81, English actor (Star Wars, Dracula, The Curse of Frankenstein), prostate cancer.
Marko Jozinović, 74, Bosnian Croat catholic archbishop.
David Vern Reed, 79, American writer.

12
Wing-tsit Chan, 92, Chinese scholar and professor.
Gene Cherico, 59, American jazz double-bassist.
Barbara Grabowska, 39, Polish actress, fall from train.
Dale Hamilton, 74, American basketball player.
Anton Giulio Majano, 85, Italian screenwriter and film director.
Barry Shipman, 82, Canadian-American screenwriter.
B. K. Tikader, 66, Indian arachnologist and zoologist.
Harold Tower, 83, American rower and Olympian.

13
Raymond Gallois-Montbrun, 75, French violinist and composer.
Valentin Kuzin, 67, Soviet/Russian ice hockey player.
Simon Robert Naali, 28, Tanzanian marathon runner, traffic collision.
J. A. O. Preus II, 74, American Lutheran pastor, professor, and author.
Rao Gopal Rao, 57, Indian actor, producer, and politician.
Manfred Wörner, 59, German politician and diplomat, colorectal cancer.

14
Elias Canetti, 89, Bulgarian-Swiss-British novelist, playwright, and writer.
Alice Childress, 77, American novelist, playwright, producer and actress, cancer.
Stanisław Gucwa, 75, Polish politician and economist.
Joan Harrison, 87, English screenwriter (Rebecca, Foreign Correspondent, Saboteur).
Joe Palma, 89, American actor (The Three Stooges).
Arthur Palmer, 82, British politician.
Rajasri, 59, Indian lyricist, dialogue writer and music composer.

15
Paul Anderson, 61, American weightlifter, strongman, and powerlifter, nephritis.
Erik Anker, 90, Norwegian sailor and businessperson.
Joe Brovia, 72, American baseball player, cancer.
Syd Dale, 70, English music composer and arranger.
Shepherd Mead, 80, American writer.
Joseph Palmer II, 80, American diplomat and State Department official.
Steve Petro, 79, American gridiron football player.
Kailash Sankhala, 69, Indian biologist and conservationist.
Wout Wagtmans, 64, Dutch road bicycle racer.

16
Wahbi al-Hariri, 80, Syrian-American artist, architect, archaeologist, and author.
Francisco Antúnez, 71, Spanish football player.
Harry Collier, 86, Australian rules football player.
John Doucette, 73, American actor (Cleopatra, True Grit, Patton).
Ahmad Fardid, 85, Iranian philosopher and professor.
Henry Geldzahler, 59, Belgian-American curator of contemporary art, liver cancer.

17
Luigi Chinetti, 93, Italian-American racecar driver.
Cecil A. Partee, 73, American attorney and politician.
Thomas Pollock, 69, Canadian ice hockey player, stroke.
Jack Sharkey, 91, Lithuanian-American world heavyweight boxing champion.

18
John Beavan, Baron Ardwick, 84, British journalist.
Martin Cahill, 45, Irish criminal, homicide.
Henri Calef, 84, French screenwriter and film director.
Gottlob Frick, 88, German operatic bass.
Yeshayahu Leibowitz, 91, Israeli Orthodox Jewish intellectual and polymath.
Daltro Menezes, 56, Brazilian football manager.
Charles Redland, 83, Swedish jazz saxophonist, bandleader, and composer.
Omori Sogen, 90, Japanese Buddhist monk.
Richard Laurence Millington Synge, 79, British biochemist and Nobel Prize laureate.
Vazgen I, 85, Romanian Catholicos of All Armenians.

19
Louis de Froment, 72, French conductor.
Ladislav Fuks, 70, Czech novelist and writer.
Anthony Peter Khoraish, 86, Lebanese Maronite Patriarch of Antioch and the Whole Levant.
Nancy Lancaster, 96, British interior designer.
Otto-Iivari Meurman, 104, Finnish architect.
Linus Pauling, 93, American chemist, peace activist, and author, prostate cancer.
Robert Rozhdestvensky, 62, Soviet/Russian poet and songwriter, heart attack.

20
Odessa Grady Clay, 77, Mother of boxing champion Muhammad Ali, cardiovascular disease.
Hermann Hackmann, 80, German war criminal and SS captain during World War II.
Revilo P. Oliver, 86, American university professor, suicide.
Aleksandar Petrović, 65, Yugoslav/Serbian film director.
Roy Simmons, Sr., 92, American lacrosse coach.

21
Albert Blaustein, 72, American civil rights and human rights lawyer.
Rose Laub Coser, 78, German-American sociologist and social justice activist.
Kathleen Frances Daly, 96, Canadian painter.
Anita Lizana, 78, Chilean tennis player, stomach cancer.
Danitra Vance, 40, American comedian and actress (Saturday Night Live), breast cancer.

22
Harry Gamage, 94, American football player and coach.
Gilles Groulx, 62, Canadian film director.
Allan Houser, 80, Chiricahua Apache sculptor, painter and illustrator.
Gary Jasgur, 58, American child actor.
André Rossi, 73, French politician.

23
Bill Burnett, 77, South African Anglican archbishop.
Joyce Chen, 76, Chinese-American chef, author, and television personality, Alzheimer's disease.
Gene Filipski, 63, American gridiron football player.
Zoltán Fábri, 76, Hungarian film director and screenwriter, heart attack.
Carlos Rojas Pavez, 87, Chilean politician.
Alfredo Pérez, 65, Argentine football player.
Gehendra Bahadur Rajbhandari, 70, Prime Minister of Nepal.
Arati Saha, 53, Indian long-distance swimmer and Olympian, jaundice.
Fisher Tull, 59, American composer, arranger, and trumpeter.
Paolo Volponi, 70, Italian writer, poet, and politician.

24
Sonny Chillingworth, 62, American guitarist and singer.
Peggy Fears, 91, American actress.
Cecil Holmes, 73, New Zealand film director and writer.
Birutė Nedzinskienė, 38, Lithuanian politician.
Rickie Sorensen, 47, American child actor (The Sword in the Stone, Father of the Bride, A Lust to Kill), cancer.

25
Hugh Culverhouse, 75, American businessman and attorney, lung cancer.
Cliff Garrison, 88, American baseball player.
Creadel "Red" Jones, 53, American soul guitarist.
Marten Mendez, 77, American badminton player.
Bidhyanath Pokhrel, 76, Nepali poet and politician.
Boris Roatta, 14, French child actor, bicycle accident.

26
Yehoshafat Harkabi, 72, Israeli military intelligence officer and professor.
Ljubomir Lovrić, 74, Serbian football goalkeeper, manager and journalist.
Norman Warwick, 74, British cinematographer.
Bert Yancey, 56, American golfer, heart attack.

27
Beba Bidart, 70, Argentine tango singer, actress and dancer, heart attack.
Roberto Goyeneche, 68, Argentine tango singer, pneumonia.
Fred Griffiths, 82, English film and television actor.
Battling Shaw, 83, Mexican boxer.

28
Pepita Embil, 76, Spanish Basque soprano.
Rui Filipe, 26, Portuguese football player, traffic collision.
Aldis Intlers, 29, Latvian-Soviet bobsledder and Olympian, traffic collision.
Vincent Leonard, 85, American prelate of the Catholic Church.
Neil Mochan, 67, Scottish football player.
Ernie Roberts, 82, British politician.
David Wright, 74, South African-British poet, cancer.

29
Tushar Kanti Ghosh, 96, Indian journalist and author.
Bruno Habārovs, 55, Latvian fencer and Olympian.
Jack Miller, 78, American politician and jurist.
Arthur Mourant, 90, British chemist, hematologist and geneticist.
Michael Peters, 46, American choreographer and director, AIDS-related complications.

30
Lindsay Anderson, 71, British film and theatre director, and film critic, heart attack.
Olav Gjærevoll, 77, Norwegian botanist and politician.
Alfonso Oiterong, 69, President of Palau.
Filippo Zappata, 100, Italian engineer and aircraft designer.
Hubert Zemke, 80, United States Air Force officer and flying ace during World War II.

31
Barbara Avedon, 69, American television writer, political activist, and feminist.
Mercedes Carvajal de Arocha, 91, Trinidadian-Venezuelan writer, politician and diplomat.
Mike Garbark, 78, American baseball player.
Ram Dulari Sinha, 71, Indian freedom fighter and politician.
John Walton, 67, Australian politician.

References 

1994-08
 08